The 1988–89 United Counties League season was the 82nd in the history of the United Counties League, a football competition in England.

Premier Division

The Premier Division featured 19 clubs which competed in the division last season, along with one new club:
Mirrlees Blackstone, promoted from Division One

League table

Division One

Division One featured 19 clubs which competed in the division last season, no new clubs joined the division this season.

League table

References

External links
 United Counties League

1988–89 in English football leagues
United Counties League seasons